Miss World is a 2002 EP released by Norwegian electronic band Flunk on Beatservice Records. The EP was only released on vinyl.

Track listing

A Side

 Miss World
 Melancholic

B Side

 Kebab Shop 3 Am (Rune Lindbæk Mix)
 Kebab Shop 3 Am (Elektromonika Mix)
 Kebab Shop 3 Am (Ivar Winther Mix)

2002 EPs
Flunk albums